Frank Lars Göran Landqvist (2 October 1934 – 7 January 1983) was a Swedish diver. He competed in the men's 3 metre springboard event at the 1952 Summer Olympics.

References

External links
 

1934 births
1983 deaths
Swedish male divers
Olympic divers of Sweden
Divers at the 1952 Summer Olympics
People from Kristinehamn
Sportspeople from Värmland County
20th-century Swedish people